Parahyangan (Bantenese: Priangan; Dutch: Preanger) is a cultural and mountainous region in West Java province on the Indonesian island of Java. Covering a little less than one sixth of Java, it is the heartland of Sundanese people and their culture. It is bordered to the West by Banten province, to the North by the northern coast region of Subang, Cirebon and Indramayu (former residencies of Batavia and Cheribon), to the east by Central Java province (former residencies of Banyumas and Pekalongan), and to the south by the Indian Ocean.

Etymology
The name "Parahyangan" has its origins from Sundanese words that mean "the abode of hyangs (gods)". Parahyangan is a mountainous region, and ancient Indonesians believed that the gods resided in the mountain tops.

A Sundanese legend of Sangkuriang contains the memory of the prehistoric ancient lake in Bandung basin highland, which suggests that the Sundanese had already inhabited the region since the Stone Age era. Another popular Sundanese proverb and legend mentioned about the creation of Parahyangan highlands is: "When the hyangs (gods) were smiling, the land of Parahyangan was created".

The train serving Jakarta and Bandung was called Kereta Api Parahyangan. Since April 2010, it is merged with Argo Gede to become Argo Parahyangan.

History
The region has been home for early human since the prehistoric era (at least since 9,500 BCE). There have been some prehistoric archaeological findings of early human settlements, in Pawon cave in Padalarang karst area, West of Bandung, and around the old lake of Bandung.

The ruins of Bojongmenje temple was discovered in Rancaekek area, Bandung Regency, east of Bandung. The temple is estimated to be dated from early 7th century CE, around the same period — or even earlier than Dieng temples of Central Java.

The oldest written historical reference to the Parahyangan region dates back to circa 14th century, found in Cikapundung inscription, where the region was one of the settlements within the Kingdom of Pajajaran. 
Parahyangan is a part of the former Sunda Kingdom. The inland mountainous region of Parahyangan was considered sacred in the Sunda Wiwitan beliefs. The kabuyutan or mandala (sacred sanctuary) of Jayagiri was mentioned in ancient Sundanese texts and located somewhere in Parahyangan highlands, probably north of modern-day Bandung in the slopes of Mount Tangkuban Perahu.

After the fall of Sunda Kingdom in the 16th century, Parahyangan was administrated by the nobles and aristocrats of Cianjur, Sumedang and Ciamis. These princes claimed as the rightful heir and descendants of Sunda kings lineage, King Siliwangi. Although the dominant power at that time was held by Banten and Cirebon Sultanates, the Sundanese aristocrats of Parahyangan highland enjoyed relatively internal freedom and autonomy.

In 1617, Sultan Agung of Mataram launched a military campaign throughout Java and vassalized the Sultanate of Cirebon. In 1618, Mataram troops conquered Ciamis and Sumedang and ruled most of the Parahyangan region. In 1630 Sultan Agung deported the native population of Parahyangan after he quashed rebellions in the area. The Mataram Sultanate was involved in a power struggle with the Dutch East India Company (VOC) centered in Batavia. Mataram was gradually weakened later through a struggle of successions of Javanese princes and Dutch involvements in internal Mataram court affairs. To secure their positions, later Mataram kings had made significant concessions with the VOC and had given up many of its lands originally acquired by Sultan Agung, including the Parahyangan. Since the early 18th century, the Parahyangan was under Dutch rule. 

The area was known as De Preanger during the Dutch colonial period. Its capital was initially located in Tjiandjoer (Cianjur) and later moved to Bandung that gradually developed into an important settlement. By the 19th century, the Dutch have established its hold over most of Java. Moreover, through the construction of Daendels' Java Great Post Road that connected Preanger plantation area with the port of Batavia and many other parts of Java, the Preanger was open for investment, exploitations and business. Preanger Regencies Residency, which was founded in 1818, became an essential and productive plantation area during the Dutch East Indies era that produces coffee, tea, quinine and many cash crops that benefited many wealthy Dutch plantation owners. The Java coffee, promoted worldwide by the Dutch, was actually the coffee grown in Preanger. In the early 20th century, Bandung grew into an significant settlement and a planned city. The pre-war Bandung was designed as the new capital of the Dutch East Indies, although World War II brought this plan to an end. After Indonesian independence, the Parahyangan is considered as the romantic historical name for the mountainous region of West Java surrounding Bandung.

Geography

The area of Parahyangan Tengah (Central Parahyangan) covers the following regencies (kabupaten), together with the independent cities of Bandung and Cimahi, which are geographically within these regencies although administratively independent.
 Bandung
 West Bandung (Bandung Barat)
 Subang (southern part)
 Garut (northern part)
 Purwakarta (southern part)
 Sumedang

Other than central Parahyangan, there is also an area known as Parahyangan Timur (Eastern Parahyangan). Together with the independent cities of Tasikmalaya and Banjar, which are geographically within these regencies although administratively independent, this area covers the regencies of:
 Garut (southern part)
 Ciamis
 Tasikmalaya
 Kuningan (southern part)
 Majalengka (southern part)
 Pangandaran

While in the west, the area known as Parahyangan Barat (Western Parahyangan) covers:
 Cianjur Regency 
 Sukabumi Regency and City of Sukabumi
The Western Parahyangan area is occasionally mentioned as Bogor Raya (Greater Bogor) if grouped together with Bogor Regency and City of Bogor.

Mapping of Sundanese Culture
The Sundanese cultural area in the western part of Java Island can be divided into several parts, including;
Sundanese Banten; is an area contained in the Sundanese cultural area in the West.
Sundanese Parahyangan; is the area of Sundanese culture in the Central and South.
Sundanese Jawa Tengah; is a Sundanese cultural area in the east, located within Central Java Province.
Sundanese Pantura (including Cirebon & Indramayu); is a Sundanese cultural area on the north coast of the island of western Java.

See also
 King Siliwangi
 Pajajaran
 Carita Parahyangan, a Sunda text on Galuh and other kingdoms of Sunda

Further reading
 F. De Haan, 1910, Priangan: de Preanger-Regentschappen onder het Nederlandsch bestuur tot 1811, Batavia
 A. Sabana Harjasaputra, 2004, Bupati di Priangan : kedudukan dan peranannya pada abad ke-17 - abad ke-19, Bandung
 Priangan dan kajian lainnya mengenai budaya Sunda, Bandung
 Ajip Rosidi et al., 2000, Ensiklopedi Sunda'', Jakarta

References

Geography of West Java
Dutch East Indies
Sunda Kingdom